The Talus Atlantic 85 DO-DO launch carriage is a Drive On - Drive Off lifeboat launch and recovery carriage used by the RNLI to launch its Atlantic class inshore lifeboats.

Design 
The design is by Clayton Engineering Limited, who worked with the RNLI to produce the launch system. The carriage works in conjunction with Talus tractors which are used to deploy the Atlantic 85 inshore lifeboats. There are three versions of the carriage which includes a standard carriage and the option of a hydraulic power pack so that the angle of the launch can be changed to suit the conditions. The carriage launch platform has a main bed which elevates through 10° to achieve this feature. The third variant of the carriage has the elevation bed mounted on a rail carriage system.

Operation 
Under normal launch conditions the lifeboat is loaded with its bow to the rear of the carriage to allow faster deployment. When the lifeboat is recovered it reverses back on to the launch bed. Depending on the sea condition the helmsman require good seamanship to achieve this.

Carriage fleet

See also 
 Talus MB-H amphibious tractor
 Talus MB-764 amphibious tractor
 Talus MB-4H amphibious tractor
 RNLI New Holland TC45 launch tractor

References 

Royal National Lifeboat Institution launch vehicles